There were three Battles of Chattanooga fought in Chattanooga, Tennessee, during the American Civil War:
 First Battle of Chattanooga (June 7–8, 1862), minor artillery bombardment by Union Brigadier General James S. Negley against Confederate Maj. Gen. Edmund Kirby Smith
 Second Battle of Chattanooga (August 21, 1863), Union artillery bombardment that convinced Bragg to evacuate the city
Chattanooga Campaign or the Battles for Chattanooga, (November 23–25, 1863) Union Major General Ulysses S. Grant, fighting alongside General George Henry Thomas, defeated Confederate General Braxton Bragg
Battle of Lookout Mountain, and Battle of Missionary Ridge, two battles in the campaign

See also 
 Chattanooga (disambiguation)